The discography for American country music singer Garth Brooks consists of 16 studio albums, two live albums and 51 singles. He has sold estimated over 170 million records worldwide, making him one of the best-selling music artists in history. According to RIAA, Brooks is the top-selling solo artist of all time with 157 million certified albums in the US. American Music Awards honored him the "Artist of the 90s Decade" and iHeartRadio Music Awards also honored him the "Artist of the Decade".

Brooks has scored 9 No. 1 albums on Billboard 200 and achieved 19 No. 1 hits on Hot Country Songs. Nine of his albums have achieved Diamond status in the United States, the most for any artist ever. Billboard lists Brooks as the 20th Greatest Artist of all time while Recording Industry Association of America list him as the 2nd-best selling artist in history.

Most of his compact discs were remastered/reissued in 2000, and again in 2007 and 2014 via GhostTunes, Brooks' online music store, on March 3, 2017, GhostTunes was absorbed into Amazon Music. Brooks is currently in a partnership with Amazon Music for digital and streaming services, which he signed in 2016 and again in 2019.

Studio albums

Compilation albums

Live albums

Boxed sets

Singles

1980s and 1990s

2000s

2010s and 2020s

Other singles

Featured singles

International singles

Promotional singles

Other charted songs

Christmas songs

Videography

Video albums

Music videos

Guest appearances

See also
 Chris Gaines, for a discography of Brooks' fictional rock star persona

Notes

References

Country music discographies
 
 
Discographies of American artists